Barry Spikings (born 23 November 1939) is a British film producer who worked in Hollywood. Spikings is best known as a producer of the film, The Deer Hunter (1978), which won five Academy Awards.

Biography
Spikings was born in Boston, Lincolnshire. After leaving Boston Grammar School he joined the local newspaper, the Lincolnshire Standard, as a trainee reporter. Later he joined the Farmers' Weekly, where he won a Golden Ear award for a fifteen-minute film that he produced and directed himself.

Spikings then moved to the entertainment world. Initially, he promoted pop music festivals and later films.

British Lion and EMI
In 1972, he became the co-owner of British Lion Films; Spikings later joined EMI when it took over British Lion. For the film, The Deer Hunter (1978), Spikings won an Academy Award for Best Picture. The film also garnered awards for several of its actors.

Nelson Holdings
In 1985, Spikings formed a Canadian company, Nelson Holdings International, with British financier Richard Northcott, to purchase entertainment firms. Nelson later acquired the home video assets of Embassy Pictures from Coca-Cola and film production companies Galactic Films and the Spikings Corporation, and formed Nelson Entertainment. Nelson had the North American home video rights and all international rights to the output from the newly-formed Castle Rock Entertainment.

Spikings served as president of Nelson Entertainment through the early 1990s. Afterwards, he formed a production partnership with Eric Pleskow.

Filmography
1975: Conduct Unbecoming (producer with Michael Deeley and Andrew Donally)
1976: The Man Who Fell to Earth (producer with Michael Deeley)
1978: Convoy (executive producer)
1978: The Deer Hunter (producer with Michael Deeley, Michael Cimino, and John Peverall)
Academy Awards 1978: Best Picture, Supporting Actor (Christopher Walken), Director (Cimino), Film Editing, and Sound.
1990: Texasville (producer with Peter Bogdanovich)
1991: Bill & Ted's Bogus Journey (executive producer)
1991: Picture This: The Times of Peter Bogdanovich in Archer City, Texas (producer)
1991: The Taking of Beverly Hills (executive producer)
1994: The Favor (executive producer)
1994: There Goes My Baby — also known as The Last Days of Paradise (executive producer)
1995: Beyond Rangoon (producer with John Boorman and Eric Pleskow)
2013: Lone Survivor (producer with Peter Berg, Sarah Aubrey, Randall Emmett, Norton Herrick, Akiva Goldsman, Mark Wahlberg, Stephen Levinson, Vitaly Grigoriants)

References

External links
 Barry Spikings
 

1939 births
Living people
British film producers
English film producers
Producers who won the Best Picture Academy Award
People from Boston, Lincolnshire
People educated at Boston Grammar School